This timeline is a selected list of events and locations of the development of the Pilbara region of Western Australia.

See also
 Kimberley historical timeline
 Regions of Western Australia

References
 Hamersley Iron (1985) Diary titled Hamersley Iron. The Pilbara Flora Collection 1984. The 18th Year of Hamersley Iron Hamersley Iron Pty Ltd Perth, WA.
 Oakley, Glenda.(1992) More dates! : a Western Australian chronology 1930 to 1989 Northbridge, W.A. Friends of Battye Library occasional paper; no. 3  
 Trengrove, Alan (1976) Adventure in iron / Hamersley's First Decade Melbourne, Stockwell Press.   (Hamersley Chronology on end-pages)

.
Western Australian regional timelines